Vishwa Bharti Award  is the highest award of the Indian state of Uttar Pradesh Sanskrit Sansthan in Lucknow. It is awarded to leading contributors in the field of literature in Sanskrit, Pali and Prakrat.

In 2014 the prize rose to Rs.5,00,000

Recipients
2009 : Prof. Adya Prasad (Allahabad)
2010 : Prof. Vashishtha Tripathi (Allahabad)
2011 : Prof. Kishor Nath Jha (Madhubani, Bihar)
2012 : Dr. Girdhar Lal Mishra (Varanasi)
2013 : Dr. Bhagirath Prasad Tripathi (Varanasi )
2014; Acharya Ram Yatna Shukla
2015 : Prof. Abhiraj Rajendra Mishra
2016 : Jagannath Pathak

References

Indian literary awards
Sanskrit literature